Simon van Groenewegen van der Made (1613, Delft – 5 July 1652, Delft) was a Dutch jurist.

Born in Delft, he studied law in Leiden, practiced as an advocate in The Hague and was since about 1645 city clerk of Delft. He gained renown as a commentator of Grotius and for his Tractatus de legibus abrogatis et inusitatis in Hollandia vicinisque regionibus, a censura that indicated which parts of Roman law still applied in Holland. It remains the leading work on Roman law in the Netherlands.

References

 

1613 births
1652 deaths
Dutch jurists
Leiden University alumni
People from Delft